The 1971 USAC Championship Car season consisted of 12 races, beginning in Rafaela, Argentina on February 28 and concluding in Avondale, Arizona on October 23.  The USAC National Champion was Joe Leonard and the Indianapolis 500 winner was Al Unser.  For 1971 it was decided that there should be three separate points championships, for paved ovals, dirt ovals, and  road courses.

The existing Championship Car championship was then restricted to only paved ovals, and two new championships were created. The National Dirt Car Championship (which would become the modern Silver Crown Series in 1981) was run over four races, and won by George Snider. The Road Racing championship was originally to be run over between 8 and 10 races, however a lack of interest lead to just two races being held on the same day, on the 7th of August at Seattle International Raceway. Continental Championship cars were allowed, and made up the majority of the grid, with just 5 USAC specification cars entered. Jim Dittemore won the series in a Formula 5000 specification Lola T192-Chevrolet. The Road Racing championship did not continue in 1972.

Schedule and results
All races running on Oval/Speedway. On February 18, the non-championship races at Rafaela were transformed into a points-paying double round, due to a request from race organizers. On June 3, the Langhorne round was cancelled by its promoter because of insufficient entries. He alleged that the event had been boycotted by a number of drivers refusing to race at the outdated venue, which was torn down at the end of the year. On June 30, USAC cancelled the race at the new Mountaineer Speedway, which was never built to completion. The 1971 season was the first time the 500 mile triple crown was on the schedule with the addition of Ontario Motor Speedway's California 500 the previous year & the Pocono 500 added in this season.

Final points standings

Note 1: Donnie Allison, Carlos Pairetti, Denny Hulme, David Hobbs and Jim Hurtubise are not eligible for points.
Note 2: John Mahler qualified 21st at Indianapolis. His car was driven in the race by Dick Simon who started 33rd as a result of the driver change.

References
 
 
 
 
 http://media.indycar.com/pdf/2011/IICS_2011_Historical_Record_Book_INT6.pdf  (p. 230-231)

See also
 1971 Indianapolis 500

USAC Championship Car
Usac Championship